Michael Louis David Fabricant (born 12 June 1950) is a British politician. A member of the Conservative Party, he has served as the Member of Parliament (MP) for Lichfield in Staffordshire, formerly Mid Staffordshire, since 1992.

Fabricant was the vice-chairman of the Conservative Party for parliamentary campaigning, responsible for the Conservative Campaign Headquarters strategy on marginal seats at the 2015 general election, as well as UK parliamentary by-elections. In April 2014, he was dismissed from this position over comments he had made about his colleague Maria Miller's resignation.

Early life
Fabricant was born in Rottingdean, Brighton on 12 June 1950, into a Jewish family, to Helena (née Freed; 1911–2004) and Rabbi Isaac Fabricant (1906–1989), rabbi of the Brighton and Hove Synagogue.

Fabricant attended Brighton Secondary Technical School and Brighton, Hove and Sussex Grammar School. He studied economics at Loughborough University, receiving a Bachelor of Science degree. He went on to study at the University of Sussex, where he was awarded a master's degree in operations research in 1974, and undertook doctoral research at the University of Oxford, University of London, and the University of Southern California in economics and econometrics. He is a Chartered Engineer, a Fellow of the Institution of Engineering and Technology, and a Fellow of the Royal Society of Arts. He was joint managing director of an international broadcasting electronics and Investment group in 1979, remaining there until 1991.

Parliamentary career
Fabricant unsuccessfully contested the safe Labour stronghold of South Shields at the 1987 general election, coming in 13,851 votes behind victor David Clark. Fabricant was appointed the chairman of the Brighton Pavilion Conservative Association in 1990 and remained chairman until his election to the House of Commons.

Fabricant was first elected at the 1992 general election for Mid Staffordshire (which included the city of Lichfield), regaining the seat for the Conservatives following Sylvia Heal's gaining the seat for Labour at the 1990 by-election. He took the seat with a majority of 6,236 and has remained an MP since. He made his maiden speech on 2 July 1992. The Mid Staffordshire seat was abolished at the 1997 general election, but Fabricant contested and won the Lichfield constituency, which was the main seat to replace it, by just 238 votes (0.51%). He has remained the Lichfield MP since, progressively increasing his majority to 4,426 in 2001, 7,080 in 2005, 17,683 in 2010, 18,189 in 2015, 18,581 in 2017 and 23,638 in 2019.

In Parliament, Fabricant joined the European Legislation Select Committee in 1992, and served on it until the 1997 general election. He joined the National Heritage Select Committee in 1993 and was a member of that committee until his appointment as the Parliamentary Private Secretary to the Financial Secretary to the Treasury Michael Jack in 1996. Following  the Conservative defeat at the 1997 general election, Fabricant joined the Culture, Media and Sport Select Committee until moving to the Home Affairs Select Committee in 1999. He rejoined the Culture, Media and Sport committee following the 2001 general election, and also at this time became the chairman of the Information Committee. He moved up to the opposition frontbench as a trade and industry spokesman under Michael Howard in 2003. Later in the year he was moved to the post of spokesman on economic affairs. He became an opposition whip following the 2005 general election and remained in the position following the appointment of new leader David Cameron. In 2008, Fabricant founded Conservative Friends of America.

In November 2012, Fabricant published a pamphlet entitled "The Pact", which called for a political pact between UKIP and the Conservative Party, in exchange for an In/Out EU referendum. In the 2016 EU Referendum campaign Fabricant said he would be voting to leave the EU. A staunch believer in free trade, he commented: "I think we are part of a global economy and that we will be far wealthier trading globally than the current situation".

Fabricant has taken part in a series of adjournment debates on government funding for inland waterways, and has called for heavy goods freight to move off Britain's roads and back onto the restored canal network.

In the House of Commons, he sits on the Administration Committee and has previously sat on the Committee of Selection, the Finance and Services Committee, the Liaison Committee (Commons), the Culture, Media and Sport Committee, the Home Affairs Committee and the National Heritage Committee.

Fabricant was sacked as vice-chairman of the Conservative Party after he tweeted "about time" with regard to Maria Miller's resignation as cabinet minister. George Eaton of the New Statesman believed his sacking related to his threat to rebel over the HS2 rail development and was necessary to deter other potential Conservative rebels on the same issue. He opposes HS2 on the grounds of its financial and environmental cost.

In a 2016 debate, Fabricant yelled "bollocks" over a discussion of the impacts of Brexit. He was expressing disagreement with the former justice minister Jonathan Djanogly's statement that UK law firms could lose £1.7 billion in earnings if the UK were to leave the European Union.

Fabricant wrote in The Guardian in November 2017 to rebut claims about him that had appeared on a Westminster dossier making assertions about the behaviour of Conservative MPs. He wrote that no one he had contacted, including lobby journalists and a former chief whip with an "elephantine memory", had previously heard the claim made against him of "inappropriate behaviour with a male journalist in a taxi".

Fabricant attracted media attention for having an apartheid-era flag of South Africa on display on the mantelpiece of his parliamentary office. He responded that he had several flags on display from countries where his former company had clients in the 1980s. Asked in 2018 if he regretted working for what was effectively an arm of the apartheid state in South Africa, he replied: "There is so much we can all regret with hindsight" and said he did not condone what was going on at the time.

On 12 April 2022, Fabricant urged Boris Johnson to apologise after he was fined for a breach of Covid rules. Fabricant said: "I don't think at any time he thought he was breaking the law. I think that at the time he just thought like many teachers and nurses who after a very long shift would tend to go back to the staff room and have a quiet drink". The remark was criticised by official bodies representing teachers and nurses, who said they did no such thing, and Fabricant said he had not intended to cause offence.

Fabricant endorsed Penny Mordaunt during the July–September 2022 Conservative Party leadership election.

Use of social media
Fabricant has frequently caused controversy through his use of social media. In June 2014, he came under criticism when, following an exchange between Yasmin Alibhai-Brown and Rod Liddle on Channel 4 News the evening before, he tweeted that he "could never appear" on a discussion programme with her, as he "would either end up with a brain haemorrhage or by punching her in the throat." Gloria De Piero, then Shadow Secretary of State for Women and Equalities, described the tweet as "utterly appalling" while a Conservative Party spokesman commented that the MP's comment was "completely unacceptable". Fabricant subsequently apologised, but Alibhai-Brown thought his apology was "useless". A few days later, Fabricant wrote that he was "still deeply embarrassed and ashamed" and his tweet "appeared to have undone" his socially liberal voting record over the last 20 years.

In August 2014, after Sayeeda Warsi resigned from David Cameron's government over its policy towards Israel's Operation Protective Edge, Fabricant was criticised for a Twitter remark that appeared to suggest Gaza was a "Muslim issue". He subsequently clarified that he believed that Gaza was a humanitarian issue and that his comment about Warsi's "strong views on Muslim issues" was more general.

In May 2018, Fabricant called a teenage constituent a 'complete twat' on Twitter after she had questioned his commitment to working in part of the constituency. Fabricant criticised the constituent for not being clearer in detailing who she was and stated that he thought the post came from a 'Russian troll'.

In July 2018, Fabricant was accused of being Islamophobic over a subsequently-deleted tweet he shared depicting London mayor Sadiq Khan, who is a Muslim, in a sex act with a pig. Some Labour MPs called for Fabricant's suspension and former Conservative Party chairman Sayeeda Warsi responded, describing Islamophobia in the Conservative party as "widespread". Fabricant said he had been distracted in a meeting when he sent it and did not spot what the image actually showed.

In May 2021, Fabricant was accused by Hope Not Hate of racism, after he tweeted that pro-Palestinian protesters in London were "primitives" that are "trying to bring to London what they do in the Middle East". Fabricant subsequently deleted the tweet, stating that "attacks on the British police as shown in the video are disgraceful". The Conservative party was asked by The Guardian for comment but declined.

In March 2022, Fabricant commented on social media that a proposed bill outlawing cyberflashing should include an exemption for dating apps. This was criticised by local councillor Joanne Grange.

In May 2022 Fabricant commented in relation to the arrest of an anonymous Conservative MP for rape, tweeting: "I am expecting a strong turnout of Conservative MPs at PMQs today, not only to demonstrate their strong support for Boris! BUT also to prove they are NOT the one told by the Chief Whip to stay at home. I'll be there!" The tweet was described by Labour Deputy Leader Angela Rayner as "grotesque". Fabricant said: "No-one is making light of rape or assault. Far from it. But those who want to read something into a comment will contrive to do so whatever. They are professional offence takers." Fabricant deleted his original tweet just over two hours later.

Media work

The Final Cut, BBC
Fabricant was political adviser to the 1995 BBC drama series The Final Cut and made a cameo appearance in the broadcast.

Celebrity First Dates, Channel 4
During Prime Minister's Question Time on 13 September 2017, the prime minister, Theresa May, said that Fabricant would be appearing on the Channel 4 series Celebrity First Dates. She asked: "What I'm not sure about is whether my honourable friend is the celebrity or the first date". Nearly two months later, at the beginning of November 2017, Fabricant came out as bisexual on the show.

Personal life
Fabricant lives in London and Lichfield. He co-owns a holiday home in Snowdonia with his partner Andy Street, the Mayor of the West Midlands. Fabricant is bisexual. He has admitted to smoking cannabis.

In 2015 Fabricant was diagnosed with skin cancer and prostate cancer, undergoing a prostatectomy as treatment for the latter. He spoke of his treatment for prostate cancer in the House of Commons the following year, highlighting the shortage of specialist prostate cancer nurses in the National Health Service. Then Labour Party leader Jeremy Corbyn responded to Fabricant's illness by stating he hoped "the treatment he got is the same treatment everyone else got". Following criticism, Corbyn apologised for his remarks.

Fabricant is well known for his shock of blond hair, which some believe to be a wig, although he has never explicitly confirmed or denied this.

References

External links
Michael Fabricant MP official site

|-

1950 births
Living people
20th-century English LGBT people
21st-century English LGBT people
Alumni of Loughborough University
Alumni of the University of Sussex
Bisexual men
Bisexual politicians
British Eurosceptics
Conservative Party (UK) MPs for English constituencies
English Jews
Jewish British politicians
LGBT Jews
LGBT members of the Parliament of the United Kingdom
English LGBT politicians
People educated at Brighton, Hove and Sussex Grammar School
People from Brighton
Politics of Lichfield
UK MPs 1992–1997
UK MPs 1997–2001
UK MPs 2001–2005
UK MPs 2005–2010
UK MPs 2010–2015
UK MPs 2015–2017
UK MPs 2017–2019
UK MPs 2019–present
University of Southern California alumni